Radio St. Lucia was a radio station on Saint Lucia, located on the Morne Castries, which operated from 1972 to 2017. For a long period it was the only radio station on the island. Its  programming featured a mixture of news, music, talk. They were once wholly owned and operated by the Government of Saint Lucia but were later privatised.  The government shut the station down on 31 July 2017 citing financial losses and unpaid taxes.

References

External links
Official website (archived)

1972 establishments in Saint Lucia
2017 disestablishments in Saint Lucia
Radio stations disestablished in 2017
Radio stations established in 1972
Radio stations in Saint Lucia